Gerard Descarrega Puigdevall (born May 2, 1994, in La Selva del Camp, Tarragona)  is a Paralympic athlete from Spain competing mainly in category T11. He has a visual impairment, and has represented Spain at the 2012 Summer Paralympics.

Personal 
Descarrega was born May 2, 1994, in Reus, Tarragona.  He has a visual impairment. In December 2013, he attended an event marking Spanish insurance company Santa Lucía Seguros becoming a sponsor of the Spanish Paralympic Committee, and consequently Plan ADOP which funds high performance Spanish disability sport competitors.  He chose to attend the event because he wanted to show support for this type of sponsorship.  In December 2013, he participated in an event related to Spain's constitution day at the Municipal Sports Centre Moratalaz in Madrid.

Athletics 
Descarrega is a Paralympic athlete from Spain competing mainly in category T11.

The 2011 Spanish National Adaptive Athletics Championships were held in Valencia and Descarrega competed in them. He competed at the 2011 IPC World Athletics Championships in Christchurch, New Zealand where he finished third in the 400 meter race. He also competed in the men's visually impaired 4x100 meter relay with Xavier Porras (T11), Martín Parejo Maza (T11), and Maximiliano Óscar Rodríguez Magi (T12) who finished in Spanish record national time of 45.45 seconds while earning a bronze medal in the event. In 2012, he was a recipient of a Plan ADO €18,000 athlete scholarship with a €3,000 reserve and a €2,500 coaching scholarship. Prior to the start of the London Games, he trained with several other visually impaired Spanish track and field athletes in Logroño.  He competed in the 2012 Summer Paralympics in London, England where he finished fourth in the 400 meter race.  He failed to make the finals in the 100 meters. In July 2013, he participated in the 2013 IPC Athletics World Championships.  He was a member of the men's 4x100 meter relay team along with Maxi Rodríguez, Xavi Porras and Martín Parejo Maza.  The team qualified for the final after setting the best time in their semi-final race.

References

External links 
 

1994 births
Living people
Spanish male sprinters
Athletes (track and field) at the 2012 Summer Paralympics
Athletes (track and field) at the 2016 Summer Paralympics
Medalists at the 2016 Summer Paralympics
Paralympic gold medalists for Spain
Paralympic athletes of Spain
Spanish disability athletes
Plan ADOP alumni
Athletes from Catalonia
People from Baix Camp
Sportspeople from the Province of Tarragona
Paralympic gold medalists in athletics (track and field)
Medalists at the World Para Athletics Championships
Medalists at the World Para Athletics European Championships
Athletes (track and field) at the 2020 Summer Paralympics
Visually impaired sprinters
Paralympic sprinters